Keith Rayner  (born 22 November 1929) is a retired Australian Anglican bishop and a former Anglican Primate of Australia. He served as Archbishop of Melbourne from 1990 to 1999, Archbishop of Adelaide from 1975 to 1990 and Bishop of Wangaratta from 1969 to 1975.

Education and ordained ministry 
He was educated at the Church of England Grammar School, Brisbane, Queensland (now known as the Anglican Church Grammar School and popularly called "Churchie"). and the University of Queensland. He was ordained priest in 1953. 
His first post was as chaplain at St Francis' Theological College, Brisbane, followed by Queensland incumbencies in Sunnybank and Wynnum, during which time he completed his doctoral thesis on the history of Anglicanism within the Anglican Diocese of Brisbane. 

In 1969 Rayner became the Bishop of Wangaratta, Victoria: he was consecrated a bishop on 24 June at St Paul's Cathedral, Melbourne. In 1975 he was translated to the see of Adelaide, South Australia as its archbishop. During his time in Adelaide he was appointed to be an officer of the Order of Australia. 

From 1990 to 1999, he was Archbishop of Melbourne. He was widely appreciated for his "masterly presidential style" and as a preacher. From 1989 to 1991, he served as Acting Primate of Australia, and between 1991 and 1999 he was the Primate of Australia.

References

1929 births
University of Queensland alumni
Anglican bishops of Wangaratta
Anglican archbishops of Adelaide
Anglican archbishops of Melbourne
Primates of the Anglican Church of Australia
Officers of the Order of Australia
Living people
20th-century Anglican bishops in Australia
21st-century Anglican archbishops